Happy Husbands is a  Hindi comedy film, directed by Anay Sharma and produced by Suresh Sharma. The film was released under the Phenomenal Craft banner.

Plot
Arjun, Champoo, and Mohit are married to wives who love them, however, they would prefer to meet other women and even date them. For this purpose, Arjun introduces them to a successful executive, Jaiveer, who is married to Priya, and has a young son. Through him they meet and get involved with a variety of women. Their respective wives are not aware of these turn of events, however, things get complicated for Jaiveer himself when his wife gets evidence of his infidelity.

Cast
 Anay Sharma as Jaiveer
 Ahwaan Kumar as Arjun
 Kurush Deboo as Champoo Patel
 Mohit Ghai as Mohit
 Archana Sharma as Priya
 Danica Moadi as Diya, Arjun's wife
 Shruti Sharma as Naina, Mohit's wife
 Akanksha as Jimmy's wife 
 Jimmy Cooper as Jimmy
 Sunil Bhalla as Bhalla
 Aray Bhalla as Happy Singh
 Gaurav Ghai as Dave
 Lisa as Dave's girlfriend 
 Tonikram Mattoo as Chadda
 Harshaali as Chadda's wife
 Heena Rajput as Heena

Soundtracks
The album features 5 tracks composed by Anay Sharma, with lyrics written by Sarim Momin.

Notes and references

External links
 

Films set in Mumbai
Indian romantic comedy films
2011 romantic comedy films
2011 films
2010s Hindi-language films